Albert Charles Matuza (September 11, 1918 – May 16, 2004) was an American football center. He played professionally in the National Football League (NFL) for the Chicago Bears from 1941 to 1943.

References

1918 births
2004 deaths
American football centers
Camp Peary Pirates football players
Chicago Bears players
Georgetown Hoyas football players
People from Shenandoah, Pennsylvania
Players of American football from Pennsylvania